Lithops meyeri is a species of living stone (Lithops), under the family Aizoaceae. It is native to Southern Africa and named after Rev. Gottlieb Meyer.

Description 
The succulent plant grows with its leaves in pairs of two, with hardly any stem, and very low to the ground. The leaves can be a variety of colors, including yellow, green, grey, black, orange, purple and others.

References 

meyeri
Taxa named by Louisa Bolus